Jeanie Lauer (born May 8, 1954) is an American politician who served in the Missouri House of Representatives from 2011 to 2019.

References

1954 births
Living people
People from Cape Girardeau, Missouri
Women state legislators in Missouri
Republican Party members of the Missouri House of Representatives
21st-century American women